Thierry Fabre (born 5 March 1982 in Montpellier, France) is a French judoka. He competed at the 2012 Summer Olympics in the -100 kg event and lost in the second round to Naidangiin Tüvshinbayar.

Fabre won the bronze medal at the 2010 World Championships (-100kg).

References

External links

 
 

1982 births
Living people
French male judoka
Olympic judoka of France
Judoka at the 2012 Summer Olympics
Sportspeople from Montpellier
20th-century French people
21st-century French people